Amir Parviz Pouyan ([Emir Parviz Puyan]; born 16 September 1946 – 24 May 1971) was an Iranian theoretician, a revolutionary guerrilla, a Communist organizer and founder of the Organization of Iranian People's Fedai Guerrillas in Iran. On 24 May 1971, Pouyan was killed during an armed action when he and his companion Rahmatullah Piro Naziri came under fire by the SAVAK for their participation in revolutionary guerrilla activities.

References

1946 births
1971 deaths
Deaths by firearm in Iran
Iranian communists
Iranian revolutionaries
National Front (Iran) student activists
Organization of Iranian People's Fedai Guerrillas members
People killed by SAVAK